Minamoto no Michitomo (源通具, Minamoto no Michitomo, 1171 - 1227) was a waka poet and Japanese nobleman active in the early Kamakura period. He is also known as Horikawa Michitomo and Horikawa Dainagon (堀川大納言).

External links 
E-text of his poems in Japanese

Japanese poets
1171 births
1227 deaths
Minamoto clan
People of Kamakura-period Japan